Andrey Kurennoy (12 May 1972 – 7 January 2008) was a Russian triple jumper. In 1997 he had a personal best of 17.44 m which won him the Russian title. He won gold at World University Games in 1995 in Fukuoka, Japan.

References

External links 
 

1973 births
2008 deaths
Russian male triple jumpers
Universiade gold medalists in athletics (track and field)
Universiade gold medalists for Russia
Medalists at the 1995 Summer Universiade
World Athletics Championships athletes for Russia
Russian Athletics Championships winners